2-Phenylhexane is an aromatic hydrocarbon. It can be produced by a Friedel-Crafts alkylation between 1-chlorohexane and benzene., or by the reaction of benzene and 1-hexene with various acid catalysts such as antimony pentafluoride, scandium(III) triflate, and phosphoric acid.

References 

Alkylbenzenes